Vaishali Made (born 21 August 1984) is an Indian singer and winner of Zee TV's reality series, Sa Re Ga Ma Pa Challenge 2009. She sings primarily in Marathi language.

Originally from Hinganghat in Vidarbha, Maharashtra, Mhade is married to Anant Mhade in hinganghat, and the mother of a girl, Aastha Mhade. She is a contestant in the reality show Bigg Boss Marathi in 2019.

Sa Re Ga Ma Pa Challenge 2009
Vaishali Mhade made it to the top 3 in Zee TV's Sa Re Ga Ma Pa Challenge 2009 with Soumen Nandi and Yashita Yashpal Sharma and because of her huge fan following across India she won the Sa Re Ga Ma Pa Challenge 2009, along with a Rs 50-lakh music contract with Zee TV, a Hyundai i10 car and a LCD TV. Mhade was placed in Himesh Reshammiya's "Rock Gharana" and throughout her entire journey in Sa Re Ga Ma Pa Challenge 2009, she proved herself to be a versatile, conventional and consistent singer. In addition, she also won the Marathi version of Sa Re Ga Ma Pa in 2008.

Career
Vaishali sung a title track for the Marathi daily soap, 'Kulvadhu', a popular show aired on Zee Marathi.

Vaishali has also sung for Shridhar Phadke in his album Sangeet Manmohee Re.

At the 2009 Nagpur International Marathon she was a special invitee along with Olympics gold medalist Abhinav Bindra.

She made her Bollywood singing debut with the song Hum Tum in the movie Damadamm! (2011). It was a duet track between Mhade and Himesh Reshammiya.

She sang at Lord Buddha live T.V. show.

She has recently given playback for the duet song "Pinga" along with Shreya Ghoshal for the movie Bajirao Mastani. The song features Deepika Padukone and Priyanka Chopra. She has also lent her voice for 'Fitoori' in the same film. The movie is produced by Sanjay Leela Bhansali and was released on 19 December 2015.

Vaishali sung a title track for the Marathi daily soap, 'Honar Sun Me Ya Gharchi', a popular show aired on Zee Marathi.

Vaishali sung a title track for the Marathi daily soap, 'Mazya Navryachi Baayko', a popular show aired on Zee Marathi. Recently she lend her voice in movie Kalank along with Shreya Ghoshal in song 'Ghar More Pardesiya'

Sur Nava Dhyas Nava

Vaishali was one of the Celebrity participants of this Marathi singing Reality Show. She quit the show on 21 February 2018 telecast to pursue PHD and MPhil.

Television

Awards
Damani – Patel Award also known as The Karmayogi Award along with Madhu Mangesh Karnik and Chandu Borde.

Best Playback Female award for film Vaghi under 5th Godrej Expert Sahyadri Cine Awards 2014.

References 

1984 births
Living people
Women musicians from Maharashtra
People from Amravati
Singers from Maharashtra
Singing talent show winners
Sa Re Ga Ma Pa participants
21st-century women musicians
Bigg Boss Marathi contestants
Screen Awards winners
Participants in Indian reality television series